Sideroxylon celastrinum is a species of flowering plant in the family Sapotaceae, that is native to Texas and Florida in the United States south through Central America to northern Venezuela and Colombia in South America. Common names include saffron plum and coma. The dark green leaves are alternate or fascicled at the nodes and oblanceolate to obovate. Greenish-white flowers are present from May to November and are followed by single-seeded, blue-black drupes.

Uses
This plant is known as a first choice deer feed.

Synonyms
Bumelia angustifolia Nutt.
Bumelia celastrina Kunth
Bumelia celastrina var. angustifolia (Nutt.) R.W.Long
Bumelia spiniflora A.DC.

References

External links

celastrinum
Plants described in 1990
Trees of the Bahamas
Trees of Central America
Trees of Colombia
Trees of Cuba
Trees of the Southeastern United States
Trees of the South-Central United States